Kevin R. Conry (born November 24, 1981) is an American lacrosse coach. He is currently the head coach for the University of Michigan Wolverines men's lacrosse team. He previously served as the defensive coordinator and assistant coach at University of Maryland, College Park, Fairfield University, Pennsylvania State University, and Siena College.

Coaching career

Michigan
On June 21, 2018, Kevin Conry was announced as the new head coach of the Michigan men's lacrosse program.

Head coaching record

College

†NCAA canceled 2020 collegiate activities due to the COVID-19 virus.

References

External links
Michigan Profile

1981 births
Living people
American lacrosse players
American lacrosse coaches
Johns Hopkins University alumni
Johns Hopkins Blue Jays men's lacrosse players
Michigan Wolverines men's lacrosse coaches
Maryland Terrapins men's lacrosse coaches
Fairfield Stags men's lacrosse coaches
Penn State Nittany Lions men's lacrosse coaches
Siena Saints men's lacrosse coaches
People from Rockville Centre, New York